Go Away is an upcoming American slasher film written and directed by David Kerr, and starring Thom Mathews, Tuesday Knight, Felissa Rose, and Robert Mukes. The film centers around a family reunion at a remote house in the woods that is interrupted by a group of masked intruders.

Go Away is set to be released in 2023.

Cast
 Christine Oswald as Liz 
 Matthew Sharpe as Mark, Liz's boyfriend 
 Tuesday Knight as Sherry, Liz's estranged mother 
 Thom Mathews as Chuck 
 Felissa Rose as Aunt Mary 
 L.C. Holt as Deputy Ledbetter 
 Justin Marxen as James 
 Robert Mukes as Blue
 De’Rome Chretien as Red
 Amber Fulcher as Pink
 Michael McGlynn as Green/Draven
 Joshua Kirpach as Yellow
 Chanda Rawlings as Danielle, Liz's best friend
 Brendan Lynch as Robert, Danielle’s boyfriend
 Emily Zinski as Heather, Liz's sister
 Zachary Thaler as Gary, Emily’s boyfriend

Production

Crew

Development and financing 
Go Away was financed in part by two crowdfunding campaigns on the website Indiegogo, which together raised over $50,000.

References

External links
 

Upcoming films
American horror films
American slasher films
Home invasions in film